Paychi (Quechua for Petiveria alliacea, also spelled Payche) is a  mountain in the Wansu mountain range in the Andes of Peru, about  high. It is located in the Apurímac Region, Antabamba Province, Antabamba District. Paychi lies north of Phuk'iña and northeast of Runtu Quri and Sara Sara.

References 

Mountains of Peru
Mountains of Apurímac Region